Shri Lal Bahadur Shastri Degree College (abbr. L.B.S. Degree College) is a government aided Postgraduate degree college which is accredited by University Grants Commission (India), 'B' grade by National Assessment and Accreditation Council and affiliated to Dr. Ram Manohar Lohia Avadh University. It's situated in Gonda district of Uttar Pradesh, India.

History 
It was established in the year of 1966 by former DM late Shri Rajendra Nath in the memory of late Prime Minister Lal Bahadur Shastri.

Campuses 
This college has its own 3 campuses.

 B.A. Campus
 B.Sc Campus
 B.Ed Campus

See also 
 Gonda district
 Undergraduate education
 National Assessment and Accreditation Council

External links

Reference 

Universities and colleges in Uttar Pradesh
Colleges in India
Colleges in Uttar Pradesh by district
Educational institutions established in 1966